Rose Loewinger (sometimes credited as R.E. Loewinger) was an American film editor and script supervisor active from the 1920s through the 1950s.

Biography 
Rose was born in Manhattan to Jacob Loewinger and Julie Gutman. She got her start in Hollywood working as a secretary to Myron Stearns. After editing films for most of the 1920s and 1930s, in the 1940s and 1950s, she took her expertise and applied it to a new path as a script supervisor.

Selected filmography (as editor) 

 Assassin of Youth (1937)
 Goodbye Love (1933)
 Deluge (1933)
 The Big Brain (1933)
 Tomorrow at Seven (1933) 
 A Study in Scarlet (1933 film) (1933)
 The Constant Woman (1933)
 Racetrack (1933) 
 The Death Kiss (1932) 
 Uptown New York (1932)
 False Faces (1932)
 Those We Love (1932)
 The Last Mile (1932)
 The Man Called Back (1932)
 Whistlin' Dan (1932)
 Hotel Continental (1932)
 Salvation Nell (1931)
 Behind Office Doors (1931)
 Beau Sabreur (1928)
 Two Flaming Youths (1927)

References 

American women film editors
American film editors
People from Manhattan
1902 births
2000 deaths
American script supervisors